Axemusic - Ao Vivo (English: Axemusic - Live) is the fourth solo album and the third live album and DVD by the Brazilian recording artist Claudia Leitte, released on January 16, 2014. The album was recorded during a concert performed on August 3, 2013, at "Arena Pernambuco" in São Lourenço da Mata, Pernambuco, Brazil.

Track listing

CD

DVD & Blu-ray

Awards and nominations 
List of awards and nominations for the album and singles.

Charts

Weekly charts

References 

 
2014 live albums
Claudia Leitte albums
Live electropop albums